Hampshire College is a private liberal arts college in Amherst, Massachusetts. It was opened in 1970 as an experiment in alternative education, in association with four other colleges in the Pioneer Valley: Amherst College, Smith College, Mount Holyoke College, and the University of Massachusetts Amherst. Together they are known as the Five College Consortium. The campus also houses the National Yiddish Book Center and Eric Carle Museum, and hosts the annual Hampshire College Summer Studies in Mathematics.

The college is known for its alternative curriculum, self-directed academic concentrations, progressive politics, focus on portfolios rather than distribution requirements, and its reliance on narrative evaluations instead of grades and GPAs. Sixty-five percent of its alumni have at least one graduate degree and a quarter have founded their own business or organization. Alumni include recipients of the Pulitzer Prize; the National Humanities Medal; Emmy, Academy, Peabody, Tony and Grammy Awards; and MacArthur and Guggenheim Fellowships. The college is also among the top producers of Fulbright Students and of alumni who go on to earn a doctoral degree.

In January 2019, following the announcement that the college would seek a merger with another institution, the college received backlash from students and faculty and announced a re-envisioning project to ensure the college remain independent and sustainable. As a result of the controversy, President Miriam Nelson stepped down; Hampshire hired its tenth president, Edward Wingenbach, beginning an effort to revise the curriculum in order to increase interdisciplinarity, collaboration, and access.

History 

The idea for Hampshire College originated in 1958 when the presidents of Amherst, Mount Holyoke, Smith Colleges, and the University of Massachusetts Amherst appointed a committee to examine the assumptions and practices of liberal arts education. Their report, "The New College Plan”, advocated many of the features that have since been realized in the Hampshire curriculum: inviting students to self-design their program of studies; training students to be able to educate themselves through their lifetimes; emphasis on each student's curiosity and motivation; learning among and across multiple disciplines; and close mentoring relationships with teachers.

In 1965, Amherst College alumnus Harold F. Johnson, inspired by the New College Plan, donated $6 million toward the founding of Hampshire College. With a matching grant from the Ford Foundation, Hampshire's first trustees purchased  of orchard and farmland in South Amherst, Massachusetts, and construction began.

One of the most important founding documents of Hampshire College is the book The Making of a College (MIT Press, 1967), co-written by the College's first president, Franklin Patterson, together with Hampshire's founding employee from Amherst College who would become its second president, Chuck Longsworth.  The Making of a College is (as of 2003) out of print but available in electronic form from the Hampshire College Archives.

Hampshire admitted its first students in 1970. For several years immediately after its founding in the early 1970s, the large number of applications for matriculation caused Hampshire College to be among the most selective undergraduate programs in the United States. Its admissions selectivity declined after that because of declining application popularity. The school's number of applications increased again in the late 1990s, causing increased admissions selectivity.

The school has been financially challenged throughout its history, largely because it lacked a founding endowment to rely on for income stability. It has relied substantially on tuition income for operations. As of June 30, 2017, the endowment had risen to $48.5 million. In recent years, the school has been on more solid financial footing, though still lacking a sizable endowment. In recent years its financial stability has relied on fundraising efforts led by its seventh president, Jonathan Lash.

In the mid-1990s, the college began establishing a "cultural village" making possible the residence of independent non-profit organizations on its campus. The cultural village includes the National Yiddish Book Center, the Eric Carle Museum of Picture Book Art and The Hitchcock Center for the Environment.

Adele Simmons served as the College's third president from 1977 to 1989. Gregory Prince served as its fourth president from 1989 to 2005, the longest tenure of any Hampshire president.

On April 1, 2004, Prince announced his retirement, effective at the end of the 2004–2005 academic year. On April 5, 2005, the Board of Trustees named Ralph Hexter, formerly a dean at University of California, Berkeley's College of Letters and Science, as the college's next president, effective August 1, 2005.  Hexter was inaugurated on October 15, 2005. The appointment made Hampshire one of a small number of colleges and universities in the United States with an openly gay president.

Professor Marlene Gerber Fried was interim president from 2010 to 2011. Jonathan Lash was named the sixth president of the College in May 2011, joining Hampshire as an internationally recognized expert on global sustainability, climate change, and environmental challenges and solutions. Two US Presidents have appointed him to serve on a national environmental council and commission. Lash served until 2018 and was followed by the college's seventh president, Miriam Nelson, who began her appointment in July 2018 but resigned in April 2019 after the failure of her plan for Hampshire to merge or partner with another institution.

The Hampshire College Archives in the Harold F. Johnson Library has extensively documented the college's history between 1965 and 2005, accessible on the college's Web site.

On August 23, 2012, the school announced the establishment of a scholarship fund dedicated to helping undocumented students get degrees. It would give more than $25,000 yearly to help an undocumented student pay for the $43,000-plus tuition.

2019 strategic partnership and financial challenges
On January 15, 2019, president Miriam Nelson and the Board of Trustees announced that the college was planning to seek a strategic partner to ensure long-term sustainability due to financial instability.  In addition, the college was considering not accepting a new freshman class for Fall 2019 due to concerns with compliance and accreditation. Shortly after that, on February 1, 2019, the college announced that for the Fall 2019 semester, it would only be admitting students who had already been offered early admission or who had previously deferred admission. Furthermore, early admission students were released from their pledge to attend Hampshire College. Some alumni protested this decision, as did many students, who organized sit-ins in the Dean of Students office and the Office of the President, demanding more transparency from the administration and board of trustees and for student, staff, and faculty voices to be taken into account in decision-making processes. While the occupation in the Dean of Students office ended after a few weeks, the sit-in in the president's office lasted for 75 days, ending on April 22, 2019.

On February 19 and 20, following an announcement of the first round of a series of layoffs affecting 30-50% of faculty and staff, Hampshire College faculty attempted to hold a vote of no confidence in President Nelson and the board of trustees. Due to a technicality, this vote was declared invalid; a planned rescheduled vote never happened. On March 31, the chair of the board of trustees resigned. On April 5, Miriam Nelson, the Board's Vice Chair, and six other trustees resigned. Shortly after that, the board announced the decision to prioritize remaining independent through a capital campaign led by alumnus Ken Burns. Ken Rosenthal was named interim president. The first round of layoffs primarily affected the admissions and fundraising offices, effective April 19, 2019.

In September 2019, there was an incoming class of 13 students, and the total enrollment was projected to be 600 students (about half of typical enrollment) due to decreased retention rates. However, around 750 students ended up returning for the fall 2019 semester.

Presidents
 Franklin Patterson (1966–1971)
 Charles R. Longsworth (1971–1977)
 Adele S. Simmons (1977–1989)
 Gregory S. Prince, Jr. (1989–2005)
 Ralph J. Hexter (2005–2010)
 Marlene Gerber Fried (2010–2011) (interim)
 Jonathan Lash (2011–2018)
 Miriam E. Nelson (2018–2019)
 Kenneth Rosenthal (2019) (interim)
 Edward Wingenbach (2019–present)

Athletics 
Hampshire athletic teams are the Black Sheep. The college is a member of the United States Collegiate Athletic Association (USCAA), primarily competing in the Yankee Small College Conference (YSCC) since the 2011–12 academic year.

Hampshire competes in eight intercollegiate varsity sports, including basketball, cross country, soccer, and track & field.

Academics and resources

Curriculum 
Hampshire College is accredited by the New England Commission of Higher Education. Hampshire College describes itself as "experimenting" rather than "experimental", to emphasize the changing nature of its curriculum. From its inception, the curriculum has generally had certain non-traditional features:
 An emphasis on project work as well as, or instead of, courses
 Detailed written evaluations (as well as portfolio evaluations) for completed courses and projects, rather than letter or number grades
 A curriculum centered on student interests, with students taking an active role in designing their own concentrations and projects
 An emphasis on independent motivation and student organization, both within and without the college's formal curriculum

The curriculum is divided into three "divisions" rather than four grade-years:
 Division I: Exploration and Working Across Disciplines
 Division II: Concentration
 Division III: Creating Knowledge

Its most popular majors, by 2021 graduates, were:
Creative Writing (33)
Art/Art Studies (20)
Film/Video & Photographic Arts (14)
Sociology (10)

Schools and programs

The Hampshire College faculty are organized broadly in defined Schools of thought:
 Cognitive Science (CS): includes linguistics, most psychology, some philosophy, neuroscience, and computer science.
 Humanities, Arts, and Cultural Studies (HACU): includes film, some studio arts, literature, media studies, architecture, art history, dance, music, and most philosophy.
 Critical Social Inquiry (CSI): includes most sociology and anthropology, economics, history, politics, and some psychology.
 Natural Science (NS): includes most traditional sciences, mathematics, and biological anthropology.
 Interdisciplinary Arts (IA): includes theater, some studio arts, creative writing, and social entrepreneurship.

The Five College Program in Peace and World Security Studies (PAWSS) is based at Hampshire; its director is Michael Klare.
The national reproductive rights organization Civil Liberties and Public Policy (CLPP) operates on Hampshire's campus, where they host an annual conference.
In 2014 Hampshire announced the formation of a new concentration, in Psychoanalytic Studies.

Five College Consortium

Hampshire College is the youngest of the schools in the Five-College Consortium. The other schools are Amherst College, Mt. Holyoke College, Smith College and the University of Massachusetts Amherst.

Students at each of the schools may take classes and borrow books at the other schools, generally without paying additional fees. They may use resources at the other schools, including internet access, dining halls, and so forth. The five colleges collectively offer over 5,300 courses, and the five libraries have over eight million books. The Pioneer Valley Transit Authority (PVTA) operates bus services between the schools and the greater Pioneer Valley area.

There are two joint departments in the five-college consortium: Dance and Astronomy.

Admissions

Hampshire College stopped accepting SAT and ACT scores of applicants in 2014 both to eliminate income and ethnicity biases in standardized testing and focus assessment on data better correlated with college success and on a longer period of time rather than a single high-pressure test. As a result, it was dropped from the U.S. News & World Report Best Colleges Ranking.  The next year, the college said this move decreased the quantity but increased the quality and diversity of applicants, eliminated the incentive to "game" the U.S. News & World Report ranking by admitting less-qualified students with higher numerical scores or encouraging unqualified students to apply.

Sustainability

The R.W. Kern Center
Opened on April 26, 2017, the R.W. Kern Center is the 17th Living Building in the world certified under the advanced green-building standard, the Living Building Challenge.  The building cost $10.4 million made possible by private donations.  It operates net-zero energy, water, and waste. The building is powered by solar panels on its roof, supplies its own drinking water by harvesting rainwater from its roof, manages its wastewater on site, and contains composting toilets.  The Kern Center was built using materials from local sources without the use of any toxic "red list" materials; even materials such as duct tape were chosen carefully to comply with strict environmental standards.  Currently, the Kern Center houses Admissions and financial aid offices as well as classrooms, student lounges, and a coffee shop. President Jonathan Lash stated that "[w]ith this building we have sought to reflect our values, in the inclusive design process, the design and materials, our construction practices, and our reporting about the building... [w]hy are buildings constructed any other way? In every way, the Kern Center was built to learn and teach.”

Climate Action Plan 
In the next 20 years, the college plans to reduce 50% of current consumption of energy, another major goal stated in their Climate Action Plan.  They plan to renovate the Robert Crown Center, Library, Cole Science Center, Franklin Patterson Hall, Merrill House, and Greenwich House.  The plan is made possible by a $1 million gift.

Solar power

Hampshire College will soon become the first college in the United States to be 100% solar powered, a milestone for the college.  They wait for permission to switch to full operation of its solar energy.  The solar panel array is a part of the college's main goal - to be climate-neutral by 2020 according to their extensive Climate Action Plan developed in April 2012.  They began construction in February 2015. Two witness tests were conducted in June 2017 and its final one conducted November 2017.  Since June 2017, part of the solar array has been powering the college.  The solar panels cover 19 acres consisting of 15,000 panels which will eventually produce 4.7 megawatts of power.  Hampshire College contracted with SolarCity to install the panels.

The college will save up to $8 million in electricity cost in 20 years and $400,000 yearly.  The 4.7 megawatts of solar power avoids 3,000 metric tons of greenhouse-gas emissions per year, equivalent to 650 fewer cars on the road.  Other solar sources on campus contribute to the primary solar array's power production: the Kern Center rooftop solar arrays, the CSA Barn, the president's house, and the Longworth Arts Center canopy. The president stated that "[t]his is the challenge that our students and every other student is going to face in the next 20 years, how to turn the US economy into a low-carbon economy ... and they're going to get the real firsthand experience of doing it. So that was reason number one.” The president has declared that switching to renewable energy is "just the right thing to do in an era of accelerating climate change."  He also noted this project will keep jobs local and avoid pipelines being built through people's communities to get power to our college."

Timeline of Sustainability Initiative

Since 2011, Hampshire College has been involved in various projects to "transform its food systems, campus operations, curriculum and campus culture to embrace sustainability." The college's advances in sustainability include various projects.  In 2011, the college was the first in the world to divest from fossil-fuels.  In 2012, they developed the Climate Action Plan for climate neutrality by 2022. Hampshire College Farm expanded their education and operation, establishing the Center for New England and Agriculture. In 2014 the main traffic circle and parking lot was eliminated and turned into a meadow.  They also stopped mowing dozen acres of lawns in hopes of reducing greenhouse-gas emissions, saving landscaping expenses and creating wildlife and plant habitats.  In the same year, they installed an electric car-charging station behind the library.  In 2015 they permanently protected 46 acres of their property through a conservation restriction. The Kern Center became their first 100% emission-free building in 2016 and the Hitchcock Center for the Environment built its new living building on Hampshire land. In 2017, Hampshire College pledged to continue to support climate action and reduce carbon emissions in accordance with the Paris Climate Agreement.  They signed the We Are Still In campaign along with 2,600 total signers.

Re-Radicalization

In the spring of 2004, a student group calling itself Re-Radicalization of Hampshire College (Re-Rad) emerged with a manifesto called The Re-Making of a College, which critiqued what they saw as a betrayal of Hampshire's founding ideas in alternative education and student-centered learning.  On May 3, 2004, the group staged a demonstration that packed the hall outside the President's office during an administrative meeting.  Response from the community was generally amicable and Re-Rad made some progress.

The Re-Radicalization movement was responding in part to a new "First-Year Plan" that changed the structure of the first year of study.  Beginning in the Fall of 2002, the requirements for passing Division I were changed so that first-year students no longer had to complete independent projects (see Curriculum above). Re-Rad submitted its own counter-proposal in both 2006 and 2007, but these proposals were not acted on, and no follow-up was attempted.

The Re-Radicalization of Hampshire College assisted the administration in launching a pilot program known as mentored independent study. This program paired ten third semester students with Division III students with similar academic interests to complete a small study—observed by, and subject to the approval of, a faculty member.

While some students worry about what they see as Hampshire's headlong plunge into normality, the circumstances of Hampshire's founding tends to perennially attract students who revive the questions about education the institution was founded on, and who challenge the administration to honor the founding mission. Unsurprisingly, then, Re-Rad was not the first student push of its type. Similar efforts have sprung up at Hampshire with some regularity, with varying impacts. In 1996, student Chris Kawecki spearheaded a similar push called the Radical Departure, calling for a more holistic, organic integration of education into students' lives. The most durable legacy of the Radical Departure was EPEC, a series of student-led non-credit courses. A more detailed account of movements such as these can be found in a history of Hampshire student activities, an account written by alumnus Timothy Shary (F86) that was commissioned by Community Council in 1990; he has subsequently been a faculty member at Clark University of Worcester, Massachusetts, and the University of Oklahoma.

Campus issues

Divestment

In May 1977, Hampshire was the first college in the nation to divest from apartheid South Africa. The college removed $39,000 in stocks in four companies. In February 2009 it was reported that Hampshire College had divested from Israel because of its violation of human rights. However, under pressure from pro-Israel groups and high-profile individuals, most notably attorney Alan Dershowitz, the father of a Hampshire alumnus, Hampshire's president stated that the changes in investments were not politically motivated.  Hampshire continues to display a statement from Dershowitz on its website, in which the lawyer withdraws his criticism and pledges his support, stating, "Hampshire has now done the right thing. It has made it unequivocally clear that it did not and will not divest from Israel. Indeed, it will continue to hold stock in companies that do business with Israel as well as with Israeli companies...."

American flag
Following the election of Donald Trump as President of the United States, on November 9, 2016, Hampshire students lowered the American flag at the center of campus to half-staff as "a protest against acts of hate and harassment." The next day, school officials announced they would allow the flag to remain at half-staff temporarily. College president Jonathan Lash said in a statement that some of the people on campus felt that the flag was "a powerful symbol of fear they've felt all their lives because they grew up in marginalized communities, never feeling safe." In an incident under investigation by campus police, the flag was burned at some time in the evening of November 10 or the morning of November 11. It was replaced the following day and the school indicated it would continue to fly the flag at half-staff "to mourn deaths from violence in the U.S. and around the world." Following a backlash, the college announced on November 21 that it would temporarily cease flying the flag on campus. This, in turn, led to protests including veterans for restoration of the flag, with sources claiming from 400 attendees to “over a thousand.” Local state representative John Velis (D) called for the school to return the flag and expel the students who burned the flag: they should "pack up their bags and leave." On November 29, shortly after Fox News aired a news segment on the incident, Trump tweeted "Nobody should be allowed to burn the American flag—if they do, there must be consequences—perhaps loss of citizenship or year in jail!"  On December 2, the school decided to raise the flag to full staff.

In the media
In November 2001, a controversial All-Community Vote at Hampshire declared the school opposed to the recently launched War on Terrorism, another national first that drew national media attention, including scathing reports from Fox News Channel and the New York Post ("Kooky College Condemns War").

Saturday Night Live had a regular sketch, "Jarret's Room", starring Jimmy Fallon, which ostensibly takes place at Hampshire College but is instead a composite of several schools. It refers to non-existent buildings ("McGuinn Hall", which is actually the Sociology and Social Work building at fellow cast member Amy Poehler's alma mater, Boston College) and features yearbooks, tests, seniors, fraternities, three-person dorm rooms, and a football team—none of which the school has ever had. The sketch also claims that the college is actually in New Hampshire rather than Massachusetts. These characters would later be revived on The Tonight Show with Jimmy Fallon during the COVID-19 pandemic. In another SNL episode aired on December 14, 2002, host Al Gore plays Dr. Ralph Wormly Curtis, a professor at Hampshire College. The same sketch implies that the band Phish attends Hampshire as well, though in reality all four members attended the University of Vermont. In Whit Stillman's comedy-drama film The Last Days of Disco, Chloë Sevigny and Kate Beckinsale star as two recent Hampshire graduates in the early 1980's in the disco scene of New York City.

Alumnus Ken Burns wrote of the college: "Hampshire College is a perfect American place. If we look back at the history of our country, the things we celebrate were outside of the mainstream. Much of the world operated under a tyrannical model, but Americans said, 'We will govern ourselves.' So, too, Hampshire asked, at its founding, the difficult questions of how we might educate ourselves... When I entered Hampshire, I found it to be the most exciting place on earth." Loren Pope wrote of Hampshire in the college guide Colleges That Change Lives: "Today no college has students whose intellectual thyroids are more active or whose minds are more compassionately engaged."

The events around the planned closure of the college that was made unsuccessful by student protests are the subject of the 2022 film The Unmaking of a College.

Alumni and faculty

Notable alumni

Hampshire College alumni have received the Pulitzer and Hillman Prizes; the National Humanities Medal; Emmy, Academy, Peabody, Tony, Golden Globe and Grammy Awards; MacArthur, Fulbright, and Guggenheim Fellowships; the National Book Award; the American Book Award; the National Book Critics Circle Award; and the National Endowment for the Arts.

Notable alumni of Hampshire College include filmmakers Ken Burns, Brett Morgan, Barry Sonnenfeld, Lee Hirsch, Rhys Ernst, Rod Roddenberry, Alex Rivera, Victor Fresco, John Falsey and Shalini Kantayya; actors Lupita Nyong'o, Liev Schreiber, Dennis Boutsikaris, Fred Melamed, Eugene Mirman and Xander Berkeley; writers Jon Krakauer, Eula Biss, Naomi Wallace, Peter Cole, and Ethan Gilsdorf; journalists Jeff Sharlett, Ellis Henican, Edward Humes, and Madeleine Baran; composers Charlie Clouser, Christopher Young, and Daniel Licht; musicians Elliott Smith, Zachary Cole Smith, Ed Droste, and Matt Mondanile; photographer James Estrin; activists Alex S. Vitale, Chuck Collins, Joseph Amon, and Lisa Shannon; Stonyfield Farm CEO Gary Hirshberg; Seventh Generation Inc. CEO Jeffrey Hollander; Thought Catalog founder Chris Lavergne; Yiddish Book Center founder Aaron Lansky; Common Sense Media co-founder and editor-in-chief Liz Perle; Duolingo co-founder Jose Fuentes; Ubuntu developer Benjamin Mako Hill; 9th United States Secretary of Veterans Affairs David Shulkin; member of the Council of Economic Advisors Heather Boushey; National Coordinator for Health Information Technology Jacob Reider; U.S. Ambassador to Burundi Dawn M. Liberi; physicist Lee Smolin; psychologist George Bonanno; NASA astronomer Lucy-Ann McFadden.

Hampshire College also houses the Hampshire College Summer Studies in Mathematics, which has been attended by Bram Cohen, founder of BitTorrent; Alan Grayson, former member of the U.S. House of Representative (D-Florida); Eric Lander, 11th director of the Office of Science and Technology Policy and science advisor to Barack Obama and Joe Biden; Lisa Randall, theoretical physicist; Eugene Volokh, legal scholar; and Susan Landau, cybersecurity policy expert.

Notable past and present faculty

Notable Hampshire College faculty includes political scientist Eqbal Ahmad; photographer Diane Arbus; writer James Baldwin; artist Leonard Baskin; psychologist and member of the Roosevelt family John Roosevelt Boettiger; architect and author of The Phantom Tollbooth Norton Juster; founder of The Texas Observer Ronnie Dugger; poet Aracelis Girmay; writer Elinor Lipman; co-founder of New German Critique Anson Rabinbach; President/CEO of Children At Risk Robert Sanborn; anthropologist Anihwa Ong; media artist Walid Raad; photographer Carrie Mae Weems; video artist Joan Braderman; filmmaker Penny Lane; Emmy-winning documentarian Ellen Spiro; and jazz musicians Mark Dresser, Marty Ehrlich, Ray Copeland, Yusef Lateef and Roland Wiggins.

See also 
 Hampshire College Summer Studies in Mathematics program for high-school students
 Tofu Curtain

References

External links 

 
 Official athletics website
 The Climax—Student newspaper

 
1970 establishments in Massachusetts
Buildings and structures in Amherst, Massachusetts
Cinema of Massachusetts
Educational institutions established in 1970
Film schools in the United States
Liberal arts colleges in Massachusetts
Peace and conflict studies
Private universities and colleges in Massachusetts
Progressive colleges
Progressive education
Universities and colleges in Hampshire County, Massachusetts
USCAA member institutions